Canna 'Florence Vaughan' is a medium Crozy Group canna cultivar; green foliage, oval shaped, branching habit; oval stems, coloured green; flowers are open, yellow with red spots, staminodes are medium size, edges regular, fully self-cleaning; fertile both ways, not self-pollinating or true to type, capsules globose; rhizomes are thick, up to 3 cm in diameter, coloured white; tillering is average. Introduced by A. Crozy, Lyon, France in 1892.

In the 1990s there was confusion over this heritage cultivar and an Italian Group cultivar with pale yellow background and orange blobs (correctly called C. 'Roma') was widely called by this name. Several other similar Italian Group cultivars were also given this name as a synonym, but examination of the evidence from early adverts and catalogues shows there is no grounds for confusing these cultivars with C. 'Florence Vaughan'.

Synonyms
 Canna 'Florence Vaughn' - confined to USA, but actually refers to C. 'Roma'
 Canna 'Florence Waughn' - confined to EU, but actually refers to C. 'Roma'

References

 Prof. L.H. Bailey, Garden & Forest 1893
 Garden and forest. / Volume 7, Issue 326. [May 23, 1894, miscellaneous front pages, i-ii]
 F.R. Pierson, Garden and Forest Journal, 1894
 Theophilus Hatfield, Garden & Forest, 1896
 Peter Henderson & Co, Catalogue 1897
 RHS Journal of 1898-9
 Railton & Co., Australia, 1900–1903
 RHS Journal of 1907-8
 RHS Journal of 1908-9

Horticultural catalogues
 Allen's Nurseries, Ohio, USA. Catalog 1944
 Sonderegger Catalogue, 1929
 The I.W. Scott Co., Pittsburgh. PA, USA, Catalogue 1939

External links
 Canna News: Canna 'Florence Vaughan' rediscovered!
 Canna News: Comparison of Crozy and Italian Groups

See also
 Canna
 List of Canna species
 List of Canna cultivars

Cannaceae
Ornamental plant cultivars